Natural salt pans or salt flats are flat expanses of ground covered with salt and other minerals, usually shining white under the sun.  They are found in deserts and are natural formations (unlike salt evaporation ponds, which are artificial).

A salt pan forms by evaporation of a water pool, such as a lake or pond. This happens in climates where the rate of water evaporation exceeds the rate of that is, in a desert. If the water cannot drain into the ground, it remains on the surface until it evaporates, leaving behind minerals precipitated from the salt ions dissolved in the water. Over thousands of years, the minerals (usually salts) accumulate on the surface. These minerals reflect the sun's rays (through radiation) and often appear as white areas.

Salt pans can be dangerous. The crust of salt can conceal a quagmire of mud that can engulf a truck. The Qattara Depression in the eastern Sahara Desert contains many such traps which served as strategic barriers during World War II.

Examples

The Bonneville Salt Flats in Utah, where many land speed records have been set, are a well-known salt pan in the arid regions of the western United States.

The Etosha pan, in the Etosha National Park in Namibia, is another prominent example of a salt pan.

The Salar de Uyuni in Bolivia is the largest salt pan in the world. It contains 50% to 70% of the world's known lithium reserves. The large area, clear skies, and exceptional flatness of the surface make the Salar an ideal object for calibrating the altimeters of Earth observation satellites.

Parts of Rann of Kutch (India) are salt marsh in summer and salt pan in winter.

See also

References 

 
 

 
Geomorphology
Lacustrine landforms
Salts